Los Kjarkas is a Bolivian band from the Capinota province in the department of Cochabamba, and one of the most popular Andean folk music bands in the country's history. Among the styles they play are Saya, tuntuna, huayno, and carnavales. The instruments they use include the charango, quena, zampoña, ronroco, guitar, and bombo.

The band's leader has always been singer, guitarist, and songwriter Gonzalo Hermosa González, who formed the band with his brothers Élmer Hermosa González and Ulises Hermosa González, as well as Gastón Guardia Bilboa and Ramiro de la Zerda. De la Zerda left group to form Grupo Fortaleza and Ulises Hermosa died of cancer in 1992, being replaced by Eduardo Yáñez Loayza, Rolando Malpartida Porcel and José Luis Morales Rodríguez. By 2002, Lin Angulo, Gonzalo Hermosa Camacho, and Japanese-born Makoto Shishido had replaced Yáñez, Porcel, and Rodríguez. Makoto joined the band after seeing them play in Japan. In the later 2000s, Élmer Hermosa was diagnosed with diabetes.  In 2010, Edwin Castellanos, who was in the band from 1983 to 1995, became mayor of the city of Cochabamba. 

Kjarkas have founded two schools teaching Andean folk music: the Musical School of Kjarkas (Lima, Peru) and La Fundación Kjarkas (Ecuador). They have toured across Japan, Europe, Scandinavia, the United States, South America, and Australia, and have composed over 350 songs. Among their most popular are "Imillitay", "Al Final", "Canto a la mujer de mi pueblo", and "Pequeño Amor".

An unauthorized translation of their song "Llorando se fue" by French producers Jean Karakos and Olivier Lorsac resulted in Kaoma's hit "Lambada". After a successful lawsuit, Kaoma paid to license the song . The song was also sampled on Don Omar's "Taboo" and on Jennifer López's single "On the Floor". Also "Wayayay" was covered by Tarkan as "Gelip Te Halimi Gördün Mü ?" ("Did You Ever Come To See My Situation ?" in Turkish) at "Yine Sensiz" ("Without You Again" in Turkish), whose debut album was in 1992.

The group's music was also used for the Argentine-Dutch film Bolivia (2001).
The group's cultural heritage is passed down in the next generation of Hermosa blood with the popular youth group band Chila Jatun, made up by the sons of this influential Bolivian group.

Discography
Studio albums
Bolivia (1976)
Fortaleza Vol. 1 (1977)
Fortaleza Vol. 2 (1978)
Kutimuy (1979)
Condor Mallku (1980)
Desde el alma de mi pueblo (1981)
Canto a la mujer de mi pueblo (1981)
Sol de los andes (1983)
Pueblos perdidos (1984)
Desde el japón (1985)
El amor y la libertad (1987)
Chuquiago Marka (1988)
Génesis Aymara (1989)
Sin palabras (1989)
Los andes... descubrió su rostro milenario (1990)
Techno Kjarkas (1991)
El arbol de mi destino (1992)
Hermanos (1993)
A los 500 años (1994)
Quiquin... Pacha (Por un mundo nuevo) (1995)
Por siempre (1997)
El lider de los humildes (1998)
Lección de vida (2001)
35 años (2006)
40 años despues (2012)

Contributing artist
The Rough Guide to the Music of the Andes (1996, World Music Network)

External links

 Official Site
 Bolivian Music and Web Varieties

Bolivian musical groups
Andean music